International Police Training Center located in Ankara, Turkey is the third biggest police training center on earth after the FBI Academy in the United States and the Police Staff College, Bramshill in the United Kingdom. The whole campus was designed by the Turkish architect Günay Erdem and world known landscape architect Sunay Erdem, with the support of landscape architect Serpil Öztekin Erdem.

Quick facts 
 Total land area: 
 Total buildings area: 
 Functions: theoretical training areas, practical training city, indoor shooting range, sports center, indoor swimming pool, stadium, advanced driving training area, library, administrative units, convention center, IPTC arena, refectory, student clubs, dormitories, training pond, technology and research center
 Project Cost: $1000 million
 Population: 3000 students

References 

Universities and colleges in Turkey
Buildings and structures in Ankara